

A25 frequencies

A*2501 distribution is primarily located in Western Eurasia.  Frequency tends to be highest in the populations that underwent later neolithization suggesting A*2501 spread in Europe.  The high frequency in Saudi Arabia is suggestive of a source.

References 

2